Gyula Szőreghy (30 November 1887 – 22 December 1942) was a Hungarian film actor.

Szőreghy was born in Algyo, Austria-Hungary (now, Hungary) and died in 1942 in Budapest. He was also credited as Julius von Szöreghy.

Selected filmography

 Mary Ann (1918)
 White Rose (1919)
 Oliver Twist (1919)
 Serge Panine (1922)
 Sodom and Gomorrah (1922)
 Masters of the Sea (1922)
 A Vanished World (1922)
 Gypsy Love (1922)
 Young Medardus (1923)
 Gulliver's Travels (1924)
 The Alternative Bride (1925)
 Ship in Distress (1925)
 Women You Rarely Greet (1925)
 Cock of the Roost (1925)
 The Wooing of Eve (1926)
 Darling, Count the Cash (1926)
 The Third Squadron (1926)
 Maytime (1926)
 Unmarried Daughters (1926)
 German Hearts on the German Rhine (1926)
 Two and a Lady (1926)
 Her Highness Dances the Waltz (1926)
 Dancing Vienna (1927)
 The Most Beautiful Legs of Berlin (1927)
 Break-in (1927)
 The Woman from the Folies Bergères (1927)
 A Serious Case (1927)
 The Woman in the Cupboard (1927)
 A Modern Dubarry (1927)
 Orient Express (1927)
 Fabulous Lola (1927)
 The Prince of Pappenheim (1927)
 One Plus One Equals Three (1927)
 The Gallant Hussar (1928)
 The Page Boy at the Golden Lion (1928)
 Two Red Roses (1928)
 The Case of Prosecutor M (1928)
 The House Without Men (1928)
 Suzy Saxophone (1928)
 Only a Viennese Woman Kisses Like That (1928)
 The Lady in Black (1928)
 The Lady with the Mask (1928)
 Princess Olala (1928)
 Artists (1928)
 Looping the Loop (1928)
 Mikosch Comes In (1928)
 The Gypsy Chief (1929)
 The Third Confession (1929)
 The Cabinet of Doctor Larifari (1930)
 The Uncle from Sumatra (1930)
 General Babka (1930)
 My Leopold (1931)
 Grock (1931)
 Victoria and Her Hussar (1931)
 Night Convoy (1932)
 Cafe Moscow (1936)
 Azurexpress (1938)
 Black Diamonds (1938)
 Two Girls on the Street (1939)
 Háry János (1941)
 Szabotázs (1942)

Bibliography
 Kulik, Karol. Alexander Korda: The Man Who Could Work Miracles. Virgin Books, 1990.

External links

1887 births
1942 deaths
Hungarian male film actors
Hungarian male silent film actors
20th-century Hungarian male actors
People from Csongrád-Csanád County